Sumbal Bia is a town of Mussiari, Murree Tehsil in the Rawalpindi District of Punjab, Pakistan.

Geography 
It is located in the southwest of the Tehsil and is bounded to the north by Jhika Gali, to the south by Angoori, Murree, to the west by Numbal and to the east by Murree Expressway - N75.

Demographics 
It had a population of 2,000 in 2008.

Professions and occupations
The majority of people work in the government service sector. The rest of them run businesses such as shopkeeping, general stores, tattoo artists and poultry farming. In the past people cultivated crops on their land, but due to unavailability of resources this occupation is left out. The common professions and occupations are:
 Armed forces service
 Teaching
 Work abroad
 Contractor

Education 
There are three primary schools
 GBPS Sumbal Bia

Demographics 

The majority of the inhabitants of Sumbal Bia are the Abbasi. Other tribes such as the Malik Awan, Qureshi, Mughal and Rajput (Khakha) inhabit the area in smaller proportions.

Facilities 
Sumbal Bia is home to predominantly poor inhabitants. The area has not been economically prosperous due to lack of infrastructure such as regular water supply, safe roads and higher education establishments. Basic services that are available include:
 Taxi 
 Food market
 Cricket ground

Mosques 
There are three mosques in Sumbal Bia:
 Jamia Masjid Al-Habib Sumbal Bia
 Anwar e Madina Masjid Lower Sumbal Bia
 Upper Sumbal Bia Masjid Hotrairi

Transport 
 Suzuki Carry is available from Sain and Gohra to Lower Topa and taxis (for local travel)
 Buses and vans connect Rawalpindi/Islamabad

References 

Murree